Matthew John Fregon is an Australian politician. He has been a Labor Party member of the Victorian Legislative Assembly since November 2018, representing the seat of Mount Waverley.

Before his election, Fregon owned and managed a small IT firm. Fregon completed a Bachelor of Business (Computing) at Deakin University in 1992.

On 20 December 2022, Fregon was elected as Deputy Speaker of the Legislative Assembly.

References

Year of birth missing (living people)
Living people
Australian Labor Party members of the Parliament of Victoria
Members of the Victorian Legislative Assembly
21st-century Australian politicians
Deakin University alumni